Belgium was represented by 31 athletes (15 male/16 female) at the 2010 European Athletics Championships held in  Barcelona, Spain, from 27 July to 1 August 2010.

Medals

1only the final
2only the heats

Participants

Men

Track and road events

Combined events

Women

Track and road events

Field events

Combined events

References 
Participants list (men)
Participants list (women)

Nations at the 2010 European Athletics Championships
2010
European Athletics Championships